Command ships serve as the flagships of the commander of a fleet. They provide communications, office space, and accommodations for a fleet commander and their staff, and serve to coordinate fleet activities.

An auxiliary command ship features the command and control components prevalent on landing ships (command) and also features the capability to land troops and equipment. These forces will be slightly less than those on a pure landing ship due to the nature of the ship as a command vessel and hence will also house the assault commander, the flotilla commander or someone of similar status (generally of NATO OF-7 or OF-8 rank—such as a major general or vice admiral).

The Soviet Union operated several space programme command ships, and the Soviet communications ship SSV-33 Ural. These ships greatly extended the tracking range when the orbits of cosmonauts and unmanned missions were not within range of Soviet land-based tracking stations. Similar U.S. vessels included .

See also
Amphibious command ship
List of US Navy Amphibious Force Flagships (AGC)
List of US Navy Amphibious Command Ships (LCC)
Airborne Early Warning and Control

National Emergency Command Post Afloat

 - conversion canceled
 - WW2 Service Squadron mobile base command ship
 - WW2 Service Squadron mobile base command ship
 - WW2 construction battalion (Seebee) command ship

References

External links
 
 U. S. Navy Factfile Entry on Coronado

 

Warships
Military command and control installations